Werner Daum (born 1943) is a German diplomat and author, specialising in the cultural history of Yemen, Sudan and the Arabian Peninsula.

Diplomatic career 
From 1992 to 1995, he was Head of the Human Rights Department in the German mission in Geneva. As such, he represented Germany in the Commission on Human Rights and various other Human Rights organisations of the United Nations in Geneva. After having served as minister-counselor at the German embassy in Tirana, Daum was Germany's ambassador to Sudan from 1996 to 2000.

Publications on political events and art history of the Middle East 

In 2000–2001, Daum was a fellow at the Weatherhead Center for International Affairs at Harvard University. In the summer of 2001, Daum wrote an article for the Harvard International Review entitled “Universalism and the West — An Agenda for Understanding”, in which he criticised the US government for destroying the Al-Shifa pharmaceutical factory in Khartoum during the 1998 bombing campaign, codenamed Operation Infinite Reach. Having worked in Sudan as ambassador of Germany during the time of the attack, he wrote that there was no evidence that the factory had produced precursors to chemical weapons and that Ghazi Sulayman, an internationally respected Sudanese human rights advocate, was a credible witness to this. Furthermore, Daum claimed that the attack caused a serious shortage in medication and that a "reasonable guess" for the deaths of civilians in Sudan caused by this shortage was in the "tens of thousands". This claim was described as "hard to take seriously" and implausible by historian Keith Windschuttle

In 1999, the Museum für Völkerkunde, now Museum Fünf Kontinente, (Museum of Ethnography) in Munich, Germany, published Daum's comprehensive catalogue for its exhibition on the cultural history of Yemen. Apart from this, Daum is the author of several other books and articles on the cultural history of Albania, Sudan or Yemen, with a special interest in the pre-Islamic history of Yemen.

Publications 

Daum, Werner. Yemen: 3000 Years of Art and Civilisation in Arabia Felix. Innsbruck: Pinguin-Verlag, 1987.
Daum, Werner. Im Land der Königin von Saba. Kunstschätze aus dem antiken Jemen; 7. Juli 1999 - 9. Januar 2000. Eine Ausstellung des Staatlichen Museums für Völkerkunde München. 1999. (in German)
Daum, Werner. "Universalism and the West", The Future of War, Vol. 23, Summer 2001
 Daum, Werner. “Democracy, Human Rights and Secure Oil Supply” Weatherhead Center Fellows' Papers
Daum, Werner and Rashid Diab (2009). Modern Art in Sudan In Hopkins, Peter G. (ed.) Kenana Handbook of Sudan. New York: Routledge, pp. 453–516

Sources 

Ambassadors of Germany to Sudan
Ambassadors of Germany to Kuwait
Harvard University staff
Living people
1943 births